Boris Dragojević (Борис Драгојевић) (born 1956 in Cetinje, Montenegro, Yugoslavia) is a Serbian painter. He graduated from the Faculty of Fine Arts in Belgrade. He studied painting with Professor Mirjana Mihac and got his master's degree at the Department of Painting in 1986.

Dragojević has been a member of the ULUS (Association of Visual Arts of Serbia) and freelance artist since 1984.

Living people
Montenegrin artists
1956 births